Tsai Yi-chen, born 23 August 1987, stage named Wu Xiong (五熊). She is a Taiwanese actress who is best known for her minor performance in Taiwanese series, KO One, as Tsai Wu Xiong, and for her lead performance in Summer x Summer as Xia Ya.

Her older sister,  is also an actress.

Filmography

Television series

Films
LOVE (2012)
Flavor Lover (2013)
Our Times (2015)

Music videos 
Say what you want – Xiao Yu
Tired – Shin (band)
24 hours crazy – Nylon Chen

Discography
Tokyo Juliet (2006)
Heaven duet with sister , They Kiss Again (2007)
Qin Xia Tian Yi Xia duet with Joe Cheng, Summer x Summer (2007)

References

External links
Chinese Weibo

1987 births
Living people
Taiwanese television actresses
21st-century Taiwanese actresses
Place of birth missing (living people)